Anthony Dewayne White II (born March 22, 1979) is an American football coach and former linebacker who is currently the defensive coordinator for the Nebraska Cornhuskers. He played three seasons in the Canadian Football League (CFL) as a member of the Ottawa Renegades and the Hamilton Tiger-Cats before getting into coaching.

Early life and high school career 
White was born in Key West, Florida to an American father and a Korean mother, who met when his father was serving overseas in Korea. After spending most of his youth in New York City with his mother, he moved to El Paso, Texas and lived with his father for a year before moving in with the family of his best friend after his dad was reassigned to San Antonio. He attended and played football at Burges High School in El Paso, and had committed to playing college football at Oklahoma State before de-committing and committing to UCLA after then-Bruins defensive coordinator Rocky Long offered him a spot at the recommendation of El Paso native and then-UCLA commit Ed Stansbury.

College career 
At UCLA, White was a three-year starter who was praised by members of the coaching staff for his ability to act as an "on-field coach", with the ability to break down an opponent on film as pay attention to who the Bruins were recruiting.

Professional career 
After going undrafted in the 2002 NFL Draft, White signed with the Buffalo Bills for training camp but did not make the roster. He also had a preseason stint with the Calgary Stampeders but did not make the roster.

Ottawa Renegades 
White was signed by the Ottawa Renegades in 2003. After getting cut by the Renegades, he was quickly re-signed by the team and played the 2003 and 2004 seasons with them before getting released in 2005.

Hamilton Tiger-Cats 
White was signed by the Hamilton Tiger-Cats in 2005, playing three games with the team.

Coaching career 
After one season as the head coach at St. Genevieve High School in Los Angeles, White joined the coaching staff at his alma mater UCLA as a graduate assistant for football operations. He was hired as the linebackers coach at New Mexico in 2008 on the coaching staff of Rocky Long, his former defensive coordinator from his playing days at UCLA.

San Diego State 
White was hired as the cornerbacks coach at San Diego State on January 27, 2009, weeks after Long was hired as the program's defensive coordinator. He was retained and added the title of recruiting coordinator when Long was promoted to head coach in 2011.

Arizona State 
White was named the cornerbacks coach and defensive passing game coordinator at Arizona State on January 5, 2018, joining former San Diego State defensive coordinator Danny Gonzales, who was hired as the Sun Devils defensive coordinator a few weeks prior.

White was promoted to defensive coordinator before the final game of the 2019 season and served as the defensive play-caller for the Sun Devils in their appearance in the Sun Bowl after Gonzales departed Arizona State for the head coaching position at New Mexico.

Syracuse 
White was named the defensive coordinator at Syracuse on February 7, 2020 under Dino Babers, who he worked with when he was a graduate assistant at UCLA.

Nebraska
White was named the defensive coordinator at Nebraska as reported by Pete Thamel on December 8, 2022

Personal life 
White and his wife Angela have two children; Anthony III and Ava.

References

External links 
 
 Syracuse Orange profile
 Arizona State Sun Devils profile
 San Diego State Aztecs profile
 UCLA Bruins profile

1979 births
Living people
People from Key West, Florida
Sportspeople from Queens, New York
Players of American football from New York City
Sportspeople from El Paso, Texas
American sportspeople of Korean descent
Players of American football from Florida
Players of American football from El Paso, Texas
American football linebackers
Coaches of American football from Florida
Coaches of American football from New York (state)
Coaches of American football from Texas
UCLA Bruins football players
Buffalo Bills players
Calgary Stampeders players
Ottawa Renegades players
Hamilton Tiger-Cats players
High school football coaches in California
UCLA Bruins football coaches
New Mexico Lobos football coaches
San Diego State Aztecs football coaches
Arizona State Sun Devils football coaches
Syracuse Orange football coaches